Community Choice Credit Union Convention Center (formerly known as Veterans Memorial Auditorium) is a building located in Des Moines, Iowa, that is part of the Iowa Events Center. Named to honor the World War II veterans of Polk County, it opened on February 1, 1955.

On May 22, 1956, Elvis Presley was the first major act to perform there while on tour of the upper Midwest. Elvis would perform in the auditorium twice more, on June 20, 1974, and his fourth to last concert ever on June 23, 1977.

When it was home to the Drake Bulldogs university basketball team (1957–1992), it had 11,411 seats with the capacity to add an additional 4,000 for concerts and another 7,500 bleacher seats for basketball games. Commonly known as "Vets" or "The Barn," it was the long-time host for minor league basketball, arena football, Iowa high school basketball and wrestling tournaments, and high school graduations.

Prior to the opening of Wells Fargo Arena, Vets Auditorium had served as the primary venue of sporting events and concerts in the Des Moines area for many years; this was also the site of the January 20, 1982 concert in which Ozzy Osbourne bit the head off a bat. World Wrestling Entertainment also broadcast their WWE Raw program from the venue. It was also the site of the 1989 steel cage match between Hulk Hogan and Big Boss Man on Saturday Night's Main Event XXI.

With the opening of Wells Fargo Arena, the auditorium was relegated to a supporting arena role. In the fall of 2010, it was closed and renovated into a state-of-the-art convention facility that added a 28,800-square-foot ballroom to the Iowa Events Center in addition to 25 new meeting rooms. At this time, the naming rights were sold to Community Choice Credit Union. However, the structure itself is still referred to as the Veterans Memorial building.  Veterans Memorial Hall was also added as a part of the renovation.  The Hall showcases Iowa Veterans' sacrifices since Iowa became a state.

References

External links
Community Choice Credit Union Convention Center info

Sports in Des Moines, Iowa
Sports venues in Greater Des Moines
Indoor arenas in Iowa
Drake University
Buildings and structures in Des Moines, Iowa
Tourist attractions in Des Moines, Iowa
Defunct college basketball venues in the United States
Sports venues completed in 1955
1955 establishments in Iowa
Basketball venues in Iowa